The Cougars were a short-lived band, formed in Bristol, England, in 1961. They specialised in rock music, mostly instrumental versions of pop and classical pieces.

Career
The band, comprising Keith Owen (lead guitar), Dave Tanner (rhythm guitar), Adrian Morgan (bass guitar) and Dave Hack (drums), signed a recording contract with Parlophone in 1963, after having been spotted at a talent contest by EMI's A&R man, Norrie Paramor.

Their single "Saturday Nite at the Duck-Pond" used music from Swan Lake by Pyotr Ilyich Tchaikovsky. The song achieved some notoriety for being banned by the BBC, despite which it spent eight weeks in the UK Singles Chart, peaking at No. 33. The reason for the ban was reported in the musical press, saying Saturday Nite At The Duck Pond was "a travesty of a major classical work". Their songs "Red Square" and "Caviare and Chips" also borrowed themes from Tchaikovsky. The Cougars' final session for Parlophone was on 16 December 1963, when they recorded "Caviare and Chips", "While The City Sleeps" and "Sausage Roll", although the latter track remains unreleased. After recording three singles and an EP, The Cougars disbanded in 1964.

"Saturday Nite at the Duck-Pond" is included in the anthology 20 One Hit Wonders, published on the label See For Miles and on EMI's Instrumental Greats Of The 60's (CDB 7 94226 2 - 1990). "Fly-By-Nite" is on Instrumental Diamonds - Jumpin (Sequel Records - NEXCD 149 - 1990).

Singles
"Saturday Nite at the Duck-Pond" / "See You in Dreamland" (February 1963) (Parlophone R 4989) - UK No. 33
"Red Square" / "Fly-By-Nite" (1963) (Parlophone R 5038)
"Caviare And Chips" / "While The City Sleeps" (1964) (Parlophone R 5115)
"Saturday Nite With The Cougars" (EP) (1963) (Parlophone GEP 8886)

See also
List of songs banned by the BBC

References

Parlophone artists
English rock music groups
Musical groups from Bristol
Musical groups established in 1961
Musical groups disestablished in 1964
1961 establishments in England